is the Japanese version of As the Bell Rings. It is a Japanese adaption of the Disney Channel Italy Original Series Quelli dell' Intervallo.

Characters
Rica
Yūta
Karen
Kazuyo
Akira
Jirō

External links 
 Official Website

2010 Japanese television series debuts
Disney Channels Worldwide original programming
Japanese-language Disney Channel original programming
Japanese high school television series
2010s teen sitcoms
Television series about teenagers